1 Samuel 18 is the eighteenth chapter of the First Book of Samuel in the Old Testament of the Christian Bible or the first part of the Books of Samuel in the Hebrew Bible. According to Jewish tradition the book was attributed to the prophet Samuel, with additions by the prophets Gad and Nathan, but modern scholars view it as a composition of a number of independent texts of various ages from c. 630–540 BCE. This chapter contains David's interaction with Saul and his children, in particular Jonathan and Michal. This is within a section comprising 1 Samuel 16 to 2 Samuel 5 which records the rise of David as the king of Israel.

Text
This chapter was originally written in the Hebrew language. It is divided into 30 verses.

Textual witnesses
Some early manuscripts containing the text of this chapter in Hebrew are of the Masoretic Text tradition, which includes the Codex Cairensis (895), Aleppo Codex (10th century), and Codex Leningradensis (1008). Fragments containing parts of this chapter in Hebrew were found among the Dead Sea Scrolls including 1Q7 (1QSam; 50 BCE) with extant verses 17–18 and 4Q51 (4QSam; 100–50 BCE) with extant verses 4–5.

Extant ancient manuscripts of a translation into Koine Greek known as the Septuagint (originally was made in the last few centuries BCE) include Codex Vaticanus (B; B; 4th century) and Codex Alexandrinus (A; A; 5th century).

Analysis
Verses 1–5 of this chapter are a fitting conclusion to the account in the previous chapter 17 as David was retained in the court (verse 2), elevated for military actions (verse 5) and obtained general acclaim by the common people and the courtiers. On top of that Jonathan, Saul's oldest son, was attached to David in covenantal friendship, confirmed by Jonathan's handing over his clothes and armor to David (verse 4), symbolically transferring to David the right of succession and making David heir-apparent. On the other hand, Saul became jealous of David, and their relationship developed into one of 'respect and hatred, recognition and desire to kill', a mixed attitude which was especially triggered when Saul heard the couplet (verse 7) giving the clear message that David would become king. Saul feared David (verses 12, 15, 29) as Saul acknowledged that God was with David, whereas God had abandoned Saul (verse 12). Since then, a prominent theme appears in which Saul was thwarted in all his plans to hurt David, while for David each attempt became an opportunity to further his triumph (verses 14, 30).

Saul fears David (18:1–16)

The last chapter ends with David talking to Saul and Abner, whereas in the beginning of this chapter it was clear that Jonathan, Saul's crown prince, was also present at the event and once he had a chance to talk to David, he immediately befriended David. Jonathan loved David (verse 1), similar to Saul, his father, had loved David (1 Samuel 16:21), and the experiences of fighting the Philistines against great odds led to a revelation that Jonathan and David shared a kindred spirit.
With the victory against Goliath, David was now seen as a brave man that Saul wanted to retain in his service (1 Samuel 14:52), and David proved himself worthy in the subsequent battles that the women who sang to celebrate great victories (cf. Exodus 15:20; Judges 11:34) ascribed a higher number of kills to David than Saul. Saul interpreted the supposedly 'non-partisan victory song' in the worst possible sense and became suspicious that David would take over his throne (verse 9). The next day, Saul got tormented by the 'evil spirit of God', that he twice attempted to pin David to the wall with his spear, but David, who was playing music for Saul, managed to escape both times. Next, Saul moved David from the position as the king's musician to be a commander of a thousand men and ordered him to face the Philistines, hoping that David would be killed by the enemies. But, this backfired when David achieved great successes in the battles and all Israel began to love him (18:16).

Verse 3
Then Jonathan and David made a covenant, because he loved him as his own soul.
"A covenant": that is "solemnly entered into an agreement of perpetual friendship".
"He loved him as his own soul": or could be rendered as "each loved the other as his own soul".

David marries Michal (18:17–30)
Saul's fear of David increased and affected his integrity as king: he took back his promise to give his first daughter, Merab, as David's wife, only to offer David his second daughter with additional conditions in order to get David killed by the Philistines (verse 25).  David responded by saying that he was a 'poor man', likely an allusion to another broken promise of Saul that the killer of Goliath would get riches from the king (David confirmed the reward promise multiple times with different people; cf. 1 Samuel 17:25, 27, 30). Saul misinterpreted David's response as a concern of not able to pay the dowry for the marriage, so he announced a bride-price of a hundred Philistine foreskins. David decided to accept the challenge, but perhaps due to Saul's 'double-dealing ways' David presented double the amount of foreskins and had the "full numbers" counted before Saul (verse 27), so Saul had to keep his word to give Michal, his daughter, to David as wife. Having David as his son-in-law made Saul fear David even more, whereas it tremendously increased David's fame (verse 29–30).

Verse 20
And Michal Saul's daughter loved David: and they told Saul, and the thing pleased him.
"Michal Saul's daughter loved David" (repeated in verse 28): the only time a woman is described as loving a man in the Bible.

See also

Related Bible parts: 1 Samuel 16, 1 Samuel 17

Notes

References

Sources

Commentaries on Samuel

General

External links
 Jewish translations:
 Shmuel I - I Samuel - Chapter 18 (Judaica Press). Hebrew text and English translation [with Rashi's commentary] at Chabad.org
 Christian translations:
 Online Bible at GospelHall.org (ESV, KJV, Darby, American Standard Version, Bible in Basic English)
 1 Samuel chapter 18. Bible Gateway

18